Tegostoma subditalis is a moth in the family Crambidae. It was described by Zeller in 1852. It is found in Kenya and South Africa.

References

Odontiini
Moths described in 1852
Moths of Africa
Taxa named by Philipp Christoph Zeller